The 1988 NCAA Division I Women's Tennis Championships were the seventh annual championships to determine the national champions of NCAA Division I women's singles, doubles, and team collegiate tennis in the United States.

Stanford defeated Florida, 5–2, to win their third consecutive and fifth overall national title.

Host sites
The tournaments were hosted by the University of California, Los Angeles at the Los Angeles Tennis Center in Los Angeles, California. The men's and women's tournaments would not be held at the same site until 2006.

Team tournament

See also
NCAA Division II Tennis Championships (Men, Women)
NCAA Division III Tennis Championships (Men, Women)

References

External links
List of NCAA Women's Tennis Champions

NCAA Division I tennis championships
College women's tennis in the United States
NCAA Division I Women's Tennis Championships
NCAA Division I Women's Tennis Championships
NCAA Division I Women's Tennis Championships
Tennis in California